Vladimir Nikolayevich Issachenko (born December 27, 1982, in Temirtau) is a Kazakh sport shooter. He finished sixth in free pistol shooting at the 2004 Summer Olympics, and eventually won a bronze medal in the standard pistol at the 2006 Asian Games in Doha, Qatar. Having pursued the sport since the age of eleven, Issachenko trained as a member of the shooting team for Dynamo Sport Club in Almaty under his personal coach and two-time Olympic bronze medalist Vladimir Vokhmyanin.

Issachenko qualified for the Kazakh squad in pistol shooting at the 2004 Summer Olympics in Athens, by having achieved a minimum qualifying score of 560 and securing a berth with a silver-medal effort in free pistol from the Asian Championships in Kuala Lumpur, Malaysia. In the men's 10 m air pistol, held on the first day of the Games, Issachenko shot 576 points to finish in a four-way tie with Italy's Vigilio Fait, Japan's Masaru Nakashige, and Germany's Abdulla Ustaoglu for twenty-third place. Three days later, Issachenko came strong from his frustrated air pistol feat to take the sixth spot in the 50 m pistol final with a score of 654.5 points.

At the 2006 Asian Games in Doha, Qatar, Issachenko fired a score of 570 to pick up a bronze medal in the 25 m standard pistol, just a point away from South Korea's Park Byung-taek.

References

External links

1982 births
Living people
Kazakhstani male sport shooters
Olympic shooters of Kazakhstan
Shooters at the 2004 Summer Olympics
Shooters at the 2016 Summer Olympics
Shooters at the 2002 Asian Games
Shooters at the 2006 Asian Games
Shooters at the 2010 Asian Games
Shooters at the 2014 Asian Games
Asian Games medalists in shooting
People from Temirtau
Asian Games bronze medalists for Kazakhstan
Medalists at the 2006 Asian Games
Medalists at the 2002 Asian Games
Shooters at the 2018 Asian Games
21st-century Kazakhstani people